Tolsá may refer to:

People
Manuel Tolsá, Spanish sculptor

Other
Equestrian statue of Charles IV, also "Caballito de Tolsá", a statue in Mexico City

See also
Tolsa railway station